Debbie or Deborah Smith may refer to:

Debbie Smith (musician), British guitarist and bassist in bands including Echobelly and Curve
Debbie Smith (Nevada politician) (1956–2016), representing the Washoe 30 District
Debbie Smith (Wentworth), a character in TV series Wentworth
Deborah Smith (novelist), American novelist
Deborah Smith (translator) (born 1987), translator of Korean fiction into English
Deborah Salem Smith, American poet and playwright
The Debbie Smith Act, a U.S. federal law
Debbie Smith, member of Ohio band Chi-Pig
Deborah L. Wince-Smith, president of the United States Council on Competitiveness